Brice Fournier (born 20 July 1966) is a French actor. He appeared in more than thirty films since 2004.

Selected filmography

References

External links
 

1966 births
Living people
Male actors from Lyon
French male film actors
French male television actors
21st-century French male actors
Emlyon Business School alumni